Saputara Lake is a man made lake situated in the Dang District, Gujarat, India. The Saputara Lake is located at a mere distance of 1 kilometer from the main city hill station. Saputara town is part of Dang district in Gujarat. It is a tourist destination.

History 
Saputara has mythological importance as it is believed that Lord Rama spent 11 years of his exile here. The name Saputara literally means ‘Abode of Serpents’.

Geography 
The lake is manmade and is quite popular for activities like boating. There are several children's parks also in the locality and several other play grounds for the entertainment of the tourists. There are several boating clubs located near the lake. The season after the monsoon is considered to be the best for visiting the lake.

Leisure 
Saputara Lake is encompassed by undulating hills and lush greenery, which make it a picturesque place to relax and rejoice. It also offers a distant panorama of the majestic Sahyadri Hills. The sunrise and sunset points of this lake provide stunning vistas during dawn and dusk. For the locals and tourists of Saputara, this spot is considered to be a popular picnic get away. This water body in Saputara is surrounded with lush green environs and beauty. The time after a monsoon is the best to visit.

Demographics of Saputara 
As per 2011 census of India, the Saputara notified area has population of 2,968. In that population 1,031 are males and 1,937 are females. Thus Saputara has higher literacy rate compared to 75.2% of The Dangs district. The literacy rate of Saputara is 87.4%. In Saputara, male literacy rate is 89.73% and the female literacy rate is 86.29%.

Nearby attractions 
 Purna Wildlife Sanctuary
 Don Hill Station

See also 
 Saputara
 Dang District

References 

Lakes of Gujarat
Dang district, India